

The Bowlus CG-8 was a prototype Second World War American transport glider to be built for United States Army, one was built but the type did not enter production and the programme was cancelled.

Design and development
The Army awarded a contract to Bowlus Sailplanes for an eight-seat and 15-seat transport glider, the smaller glider was designated the XCG-7 and the larger the XCG-8. The company encountered serious problems with the design of the larger XCG-8 and the company asked for assistance from the Douglas Aircraft Company, to no avail as the XCG-8 failed testing and did not enter production. The glider was made from wood and fabric, it was destroyed in a storm in June 1943.

Variants
XCG-8
Prototype 15-seat transport glider, one built.

Specifications (XCG-8)

See also

References

Note

Bibliography
 

1940s United States military transport aircraft
Glider aircraft